Paul Rincon (born 1977) is a British journalist specialising in science and technology. He currently works as a science and technology journalist for BBC News, where he has reported across online, radio and television platforms. He covers a wide range of subjects, including astronomy, crewed and robotic spaceflight, human evolution, crustaceans  and particle physics.

Popular science
Rincon received a special citation at the 2009 Sir Arthur Clarke Awards, held at Charterhouse School in Godalming, UK, where the BBC News Science Team was awarded the prize for best space reporting.

External links
Paul Rincon at Journalisted
Sir Arthur Clarke Awards 2009
Frozen baby mammoth coverage, Knight Science Journalism Tracker (MIT)
Active glacier found on Mars, Knight Science Journalism Tracker (MIT)

References

BBC newsreaders and journalists
British male journalists
1977 births
Living people